Goncelin is a commune in the Isère department in the Auvergne-Rhône-Alpes region in Southeastern France. In 2018, it had a population of 2,470.

Population

See also
Communes of the Isère department

References

Communes of Isère
Isère communes articles needing translation from French Wikipedia